Carlos Manuel Piedra y Piedra (or Carlos Modesto Piedra y Piedra) (1895–1988) was a Cuban politician who served as the Interim President of Cuba for a single day (January 2–3, 1959) during the transition of power between Fulgencio Batista and revolutionary leader Fidel Castro in the Cuban Revolution. Piedra was appointed interim president by a junta led by Eulogio Cantillo in accordance with the 1940 Cuban Constitution. Piedra had previously been the eldest judge of the Supreme Court. The appointment of Piedra, the last president to be born under Spanish Cuba, was met with opposition from Castro, who believed that Manuel Urrutia should be appointed.

He was married to María Luisa Martínez Díaz and had two daughters, Isis and Flavia Piedra Martínez.

References

1895 births
1988 deaths
People from Havana
Cuban people of Spanish descent
Piedra, Carlos Manuel
Cuban judges
People of the Cuban Revolution
1950s in Cuba
1959 in Cuba
20th-century Cuban politicians